Yogendra Singh (November 2, 1932 – May 10, 2020) was an Indian sociologist. He was one of the founders of the Centre for the Study of Social Systems, Jawaharlal Nehru University, New Delhi, India, where he was a professor emeritus of Sociology, and where he has been a professor since 1971. Prior to that, he went to Stanford University, USA in 1967–68 on a Fulbright Fellowship and was Professor and Head of the Department of Sociology, Jodhpur University.

He obtained his master's and PhD degrees from, Lucknow University, he has been the President of the Indian Sociological Society, and received the 'Indian Sociological Society  Life Time Achievement Award' in 2007, apart from Best Social Scientist    Award of the Government of Madhya Pradesh. Singh was born in Chaukhara, Siddharth Nagar, India. Singh died on 10 May 2020.

He is famous for his work on critically analyzing the process of modernisation of India, the limitation of Sanskritisation, Westernisation and Little and Great Tradition in explaining Social Change in India, and he had an integrated approach in analyzing social change in India by considering all factors of social change.

Bibliography
 Modernization of Indian tradition: a systemic study of social change, by Yogendra Singh. Thomson Press (India), Publication Division, 1973.
 Traditions of non-violence,  T K K Narayanan Unnithan and  Yogendra Singh. Arnold-Heinemann India, 1973.
 Essays on modernization in India, by Yogendra Singh. Manohar, 1978.
 Indian Sociology: Social Conditioning and Emerging Concerns, Part 1, by Yogendra Singh. Vistaar Publications, 1986. .
 Social Change in India: Crisis and Resilience, by Yogendra Singh. Har-Anand Publications, 1993. .
 Social stratification and change in India, by Yogendra Singh. 2nd. revised edition. Manohar, 1997. .
 Culture change in India: identity and globalization, by Yogendra Singh. Rawat Publications, 2000.
 Ideology and theory in Indian sociology, by Yogendra Singh. Rawat Publications, 2004. .
 Theory and ideology in Indian sociology: essays in honour of Professor Yogendra Singh, ed. Narendra Kumar Singhi. Rawat Publications, 1996.
 Science and Modern India: An Institutional History, C. 1784-1947. Yogendra Singh and  D. P. Chattopadhyaya. Pearson Education India, 2011. .

References

External links
  Centre for the Study of Social Systems, website

Indian sociologists
Academic staff of Jawaharlal Nehru University
1932 births
2020 deaths
University of Lucknow alumni
Sociology educators
Indian social sciences writers